Masonville is an unincorporated community located within Mount Laurel Township, Burlington County, New Jersey, United States. Located east of Moorestown, the community of Masonville was developed when a highway was built in 1794. Major roads in Masonville include County Route 537 and Route 38.

Masonville once had a post office with ZIP Code 08054. It was eventually replaced by the Mount Laurel post office, which was assigned the same ZIP Code and designed to serve a larger area.

Transportation
New Jersey Transit provides bus service to and from Philadelphia on the 413 route.

References

External links
Historic Images of Burlington County - Masonville

Mount Laurel, New Jersey
Unincorporated communities in Burlington County, New Jersey
Unincorporated communities in New Jersey